Byron LaBeach (11 October 1930 – 12 December 2021) was a Jamaican sprinter who competed in the 1952 Summer Olympics.

Life and career
LaBeach was born in Kingston, Jamaica, on 11 October 1930. He also won gold medals at the Central American and Caribbean Games with the Jamaican 4×100 metres relay and 4×400 metres relay teams. He was the brother of Panamanian sprinter Lloyd La Beach. Byron LaBeach died on 12 December 2021, at the age of 91.

Competition record

References

1930 births
2021 deaths
Sportspeople from Kingston, Jamaica
Jamaican male sprinters
Olympic athletes of Jamaica
Athletes (track and field) at the 1952 Summer Olympics
Central American and Caribbean Games gold medalists for Jamaica
Competitors at the 1954 Central American and Caribbean Games
Central American and Caribbean Games medalists in athletics